Priest of Evil is a 2010 Finnish mystery film directed by Olli Saarela. The film is loosely based upon a novel by Matti Yrjänä Joensuu.

Cast 
 Peter Franzén as Rikosylikonstaapeli Timo Harjunpää
 Irina Björklund as Elisa Harjunpää
 Sampo Sarkola as Johannes Heino
 Jenni Banerjee as Rikoskonstaapeli Onerva Nykänen
  as Paulina Harjunpää
  as Matti
  as Matias Krankke
 Ville Virtanen as Rikoskomisario Mäki
 Tommi Korpela as Kengu
 Maria Järvenhelmi as Cessi

References

External links 

2010s mystery films
Finnish thriller drama films
2010s Finnish-language films